Paul Nelson Kilgus (born February 2, 1962) is an American former professional baseball pitcher. He played in Major League Baseball (MLB) for the Texas Rangers, Chicago Cubs, Toronto Blue Jays, Baltimore Orioles, and St. Louis Cardinals.

Early life
Kilgus is 1984 graduate of The University of Kentucky. In 1982, he played collegiate summer baseball with the Chatham A's of the Cape Cod Baseball League. He was drafted by the Texas Rangers in the 43rd round of the 1984 amateur draft.

Fast facts

He also threw 3 shutouts that year.
 On December 5, 1988, he was traded by the Texas Rangers with minor leaguers Luis Benitez and Pablo Delgado, Curtis Wilkerson, Mitch Williams, and Steve Wilson to the Chicago Cubs for Rafael Palmeiro, Jamie Moyer, and Drew Hall.
 Kilgus pitched 3 scoreless innings in the 1989 Playoffs for the Chicago Cubs.
 He was acquired by the Orioles from the Blue Jays for Mickey Weston on December 14, 1990. He had a 6.06 earned run average (ERA) without a decision for the Blue Jays and a 6–8 record with a 2.84 ERA for the Syracuse Chiefs during the 1990 season. He went 0–2 with a 5.28 ERA for the Orioles and 2–2 with a 5.76 ERA for the Rochester Red Wings before his release on October 16, 1991.
 Kilgus coached the Bowling Green, KY team in the Little League World Series in 2015.

References

Sources

1962 births
Living people
American expatriate baseball players in Canada
Baltimore Orioles players
Baseball players from Kentucky
Chatham Anglers players
Chicago Cubs players
Iowa Cubs players
Kentucky Wildcats baseball players
Louisville Redbirds players
Major League Baseball pitchers
Oklahoma City 89ers players
Rochester Red Wings players
Salem Redbirds players
Sportspeople from Bowling Green, Kentucky
St. Louis Cardinals players
Syracuse Chiefs players
Texas Rangers players
Tri-Cities Triplets players
Toronto Blue Jays players
Tulsa Drillers players